Psilorhynchus robustus is an Asian freshwater ray-finned fish of the torrent minnow genus Psilorhynchus. It is benthopelagic and found in the headwaters of the Ataran River basin in Burma (Myanmar).

References 

robustus
Taxa named by Kevin W. Conway
Taxa named by Maurice Kottelat
Fish described in 2007